was a Japanese alpine skier. He competed in three events at the 1952 Winter Olympics.

References

External links
  

1925 births
Possibly living people
Japanese male alpine skiers
Olympic alpine skiers of Japan
People from Otaru
Alpine skiers at the 1952 Winter Olympics
Sportspeople from Hokkaido
20th-century Japanese people